George Beaumont (1753–1827), 7th baronet, was British MP for Bere Alston, amateur painter, patron and collector.

George Beaumont may also refer to:

Other baronets
Sir George Beaumont, 4th Baronet (c. 1664–1737), English MP for Leicester
Sir George Beaumont, 6th Baronet (1726–1762) of the Beaumont baronets
Sir George Howland Willoughby Beaumont, 8th Baronet (1799–1845) of the Beaumont baronets
Sir George Howland Beaumont, 9th Baronet (1828–1882) of the Beaumont baronets
Sir George Howland William Beaumont, 10th Baronet (1851–1914) of the Beaumont baronets
Sir George Arthur Hamilton Beaumont, 11th Baronet (1881–1933) of the Beaumont baronets
Sir George Howland Francis Beaumont, 12th Baronet (1924–2011) of the Beaumont baronets

Others
George Beaumont, character in On the Edge of Innocence
George Beaumont (minister) (fl. 1800–1830), British nonconformist and controversialist 
George Beaumont (Dean of Derry), seventeenth-century Church of Ireland priest and Dean of Derry
George Beaumont (Archdeacon of Invercargill and Queenstown), nineteenth-century priest of the Anglican Diocese of Dunedin
George Beaumont (rower)

See also
Beaumont (surname)